William Battle may refer to:

Bill Battle (born 1941), American football coach
William Henry Battle (1855–1936), English surgeon
William Horn Battle (1802–1879), American jurist and law professor
William C. Battle (1920–2008), American diplomat, lawyer and businessman